Dynamic Herb Cebu Football Club (also known as DH Cebu F.C. or Cebu Football Club) is a Filipino professional football club based in Cebu City. The team plays in the Philippines Football League (PFL), the top-flight league of football in the Philippines.

The club was founded in 2021. Affiliated with Cebu Football Association, Cebu F.C. is the third professional club to represent its region, after Cebu Queen City United which competed in UFL Division 2, and Global Cebu which competed in the PFL.

History
The club is owned by Dynamic Herb Sports Incorporated, under the management of Ugur Tasci, a Turkish businessman who first arrived in the Philippines in 1994, together with his brother, Cem Tasci who developed  Leylam Football Club that brought honors to Cebu in football tournaments, locally and abroad. Following the success of Leylam, Tasci formed a new club that would join the Philippines Football League.

Philippines Football League
In 2021, it was reported that Dynamic Herb Cebu was applying for a license to be able to join the PFL as early as that season. On 31 July 2021, Dynamic Herb Cebu was granted a provisional license pending full compliance of requirements that would allow it to participate in the 2021 PFL season. The club is the successor of Leylam FC.

2021 season
Dynamic Herb Cebu's initial roster composed mostly of homegrown players from Leylam reinforced by players from other PFL clubs and collegiate teams. The club's provisional license was affirmed on 24 August 2021. The club was scheduled to debut in the 2021 PFL season, but the competition was cancelled due to the COVID-19 pandemic. The club played its first competitive match on November 11, 2021, a 1–0 loss to Stallion Laguna at the 2021 Copa Paulino Alcantara. Cebu qualified in the 2021 Copa Paulino Alcantara semi-finals as group runners-up. They lost to eventual champions Kaya F.C.-Iloilo 1–0 in the semifinals. Cebu finished their 2021 season as fourth placers in the Copa Paulino Alcantara after losing to Stallion Laguna via penalty shootout.

2022 season
After securing a partnership with Turkish Süper Lig club Hatayspor, Cebu signed Mehmet Kakil as the club's new head coach with Levent Öztürk as his assistant. They also signed former Hatayspor youth players Mert Altinöz and Arda Çinkir while Nazim Özcan was signed on loan.

Cebu started their 2022 season by defeating Stallion Laguna 2–0 in the 2022 Copa Paulino Alcantara, recording their first ever victory since the club's foundation. Cebu finished second in the table and captured a semi-finals berth for the second straight season. They lost to eventual champions United City 1–0 in the semifinals. Cebu once again finished as fourth placers in the Copa Paulino Alcantara after losing to Stallion Laguna 2–1.

Cebu made their Philippines Football League debut in a 3–0 defeat against Kaya F.C.-Iloilo.

Affiliation with Hatayspor
In January 2022 the club launched a partnership with Süper Lig club Hatayspor. The partnership with Hatayspor aims to develop both men's and women's team and the development of football academic programs for the youth academy. Also part of the agreement are the exchange of coaching staff and players, including those who are in the academy.

Stadium
Cebu F.C. will play its home games at the Dynamic Herb Sports Complex in Talisay. The sports complex has a stadium with 500 seating capacity, two FIFA-standard football fields, and indoor arena that accommodates several sporting events like futsal, basketball, badminton, and volleyball.

Crest and colors
Cebu's crest colors are red, white, grey and black and features a whale shark from Oslob, Cebu.

Kit manufacturers and shirt sponsors

1Major shirt sponsor (names located at the front of the shirt).
2Secondary sponsor (names mostly located at the back of the shirt).

Players

First team squad

Out on loan

Personnel

Head coaches

Records

Affiliated clubs
''The following club is currently affiliated with Cebu:
  Hatayspor (2022–present)

References

External links

Football clubs in the Philippines
Dynamic Herb Cebu
Association football clubs established in 2021
2021 establishments in the Philippines
Sports in Cebu